Know Your Enemy is the sixth studio album by Welsh rock band Manic Street Preachers. It was released on 19 March 2001 by record label Epic. It was supported by four singles; two of them, "So Why So Sad" and "Found That Soul", were released on the same day for promotional purposes.

The band originally envisioned Know Your Enemy as two separate albums: Door to the River, which consisted of reflective, personal material, and the heavier, more politically-leaning Solidarity, with the intent of releasing both on the same day. However, their record label was not inclined to follow through on the idea (as they would later do in 2013–2014 with Rewind the Film and Futurology), so the material ended up released as one album, a move that drummer Sean Moore described as "strange" and "confusing".

Whilst Know Your Enemy sold well commercially, it did not match the same success as its predecessor, This Is My Truth Tell Me Yours. Critics were somewhat divided in their opinions, but its reception has been mostly positive. In 2022, the band released a remixed version of Know Your Enemy, with a revised track listing closer to the double album that they previously intended.

Background 
The album features Nicky Wire's debut as a lead vocalist, on the track "Wattsville Blues", and James Dean Bradfield's debut as a lyricist, on "Ocean Spray". Kevin Shields of My Bloody Valentine plays guitar on the album's final track.

The left-wing political convictions of the Manic Street Preachers are apparent in many of the album's songs. "Baby Elián" comments on the strained relations between the United States and Cuba as seen in the Elián González affair. The band also pays tribute to singer and Civil Rights activist Paul Robeson in the song "Let Robeson Sing".
 
About the political side of the record Wire spoke in an interview about the subject: "Unfortunately it was four years before everyone else got interested in politics. It took everyone else a war. Where have these people been the last four years? Forty years? American foreign policy's never changed. There's a track called 'Freedom of Speech Won't Feed My Children' about forcing freedom on societies that says everything we ever needed to say." Wire also described the album as "a deeply flawed, highly enjoyable folly".

Musically, the album departs from the arena rock sound of their previous two albums for a bigger and more abrasive rock sound. The album also features influences from various genres. On the album's diverse sound, Pitchfork Media stated: "Know Your Enemy finds the Manics attempting to write a protest song in just about every genre." The punk rock-influenced "riotous" sound of the tracks "Found That Soul", "Intravenous Agnostic", and "Dead Martyrs" attribute influences to Sonic Youth and Joy Division. Tracks such as "The Year of Purification" and "Epicentre" foray to a R.E.M.-indebted jangle-pop style. The tracks "So Why So Sad" and "Miss Europa Disco Dancer" were described as "a Beach Boys homage" and "a disco parody" respectively. The tracks "My Guernica", "His Last Painting", and "The Convalescent" were also described as "dark, marching and charging post-punk anthems".

Sean Moore stated in an interview to a Spanish reporter in 2014 that the songs included in Know Your Enemy were originally meant for two different albums with different sounds and concepts. The songs ended up all together in one album as the record label was not inclined to put out two albums at the same time (as they would do in 2013–2014 with Rewind the Film and Futurology). For this reason, Moore describes the album as "strange" and "confusing".

Nicky Wire reflected on the album in 2021: "Musically, I was particularly lazy and destructive. Constantly saying, 'It's too tight - can't we use the demo?' Too many lyrics just weren't finished. The original idea was to have two albums: one called Solidarity, after the Polish trade union movement, and one called Door to the River, which was the softer side. James just looked at me: 'Why are you trying to do this weird shit all the time?' In a nice way."

Release 

Know Your Enemy was released on 19 March 2001. The album debuted and peaked on number 2 in the UK Album Chart, spending a total of 16 weeks there. In Ireland the album reached number 5. Around the world it was pretty successful, peaking at number 3 in Finland and remaining 5 weeks in the Finnish charts. It was number 6 in Denmark, number 7 in Sweden, and number 8 in Norway and in Greece. In Germany, Belgium and in Australia it charted within the top 20.

Four singles from the album were released. "So Why So Sad" and "Found That Soul" were released on the same day while "Ocean Spray" and "Let Robeson Sing" were released later. All four singles charted within the top 20 in the UK Singles Chart.

Know Your Enemy has reached the top 10 in seven countries. It peaked at number 5 in the European charts. Since its release in March 2001 Know Your Enemy more than 200.000 of those being in the UK alone.

In 2021, Nicky Wire reflected on the album's reputation and sales: "To this day, you see Know Your Enemy at service stations for £2.99, because they bought so many thinking it was by one of those commercial bands! In retrospect, it sold half a million copies. Imagine what we'd give for that now."

Reception 

Know Your Enemy received generally mixed reviews from critics. At Metacritic the album has a score of 57, which indicates "mixed or average reviews".

Robert Christgau gave the album a two-star honorable mention, calling it "punk propaganda poppified" and citing "Ocean Spray" and "Let Robeson Sing" as highlights.

Victoria Segal from the NME gave a positive review to the album and wrote: "Know Your Enemy sees them scrabbling for some of that early freedom, catapulting themselves back to a time when their minds could only just keep pace with their lipsticked mouths and they had all the establishment credentials of a red light district. It's a dangerous mission, returning to the scene of your earliest triumphs is a textbook example of the fool's errand."

Pitchfork Media described the album as "provocative, well-done, but not quite focused enough to take the listener anywhere in particular."

Mojo called the album "such a sprawling, unwieldy beast that the instrumental hooks take time to emerge".

A negative review came from Rolling Stone, which wrote: "Nowhere amidst all the confusion is there even a worthwhile tune to be salvaged", calling it "hideously dull".

Track listing

2022 Remastered Edition
On 9 September 2022, Manic Street Preachers released an expanded and remastered version of Know Your Enemy. While putting together the reissue, Nicky Wire proposed recreating the reissue as the two-part album that the band originally envisioned, with James Dean Bradfield agreeing to the idea on the condition that he was allowed to remix it with Dave Eringa.

Note: On the standard 2-CD and vinyl versions, Door to the River is a 10-track album and Solidarity is a 12-track album. On the 3-CD boxset version, b-sides and alternate remixes are added to each of the above-mentioned discs, while the third disc contains demos.

Personnel 

 Manic Street Preachers

 James Dean Bradfield – lead vocals, lead and rhythm guitar, keyboards on "Freedom of Speech Won't Feed My Children"
 Sean Moore – drums, drum programming, trumpet
 Nicky Wire – bass guitar, lead vocals on "Wattsville Blues", acoustic guitar, backing vocals

 Additional personnel

 Nick Nasmyth – keyboards, backing vocals
 Kevin Shields – guitar on "Freedom of Speech Won't Feed My Children" and "Dead Martyrs"

 Technical personnel

 Dave Eringa – engineering on tracks 1, 2, 4, 7, 8 and 11–14, mixing on tracks 1–4, 6–9 and 11–16, production
 David Holmes – additional production on tracks 9, 12 and 16
 Greg Haver – production and engineering on "Royal Correspondent" and "Freedom of Speech Won't Feed My Children"
 Mike Hedges – mixing and production on "Let Robeson Sing"
 Gerr McDonnel – engineering and mixing on "Let Robeson Sing"
 Lee Butler – engineering on tracks 1, 2, 4, 7, 8 and 11–14
 Guy Massey – engineering on "The Year of Putrification" and "Baby Elián"
 Tom Lord-Alge – mixing on "His Last Painting"
 The Avalanches – remixing on "So Why So Sad (Sean Penn Mix – Avalanches)"
 Bobby Dazzler – production on "So Why So Sad" (Sean Penn Mix – Avalanches)

Charts

Weekly charts

European charts

Charts (Remastered Edition)

Year-end charts

Certifications

References

External links 

Know Your Enemy at YouTube (streamed copy where licensed)
 

Manic Street Preachers albums
2001 albums
Epic Records albums
Albums produced by Mike Hedges
Albums produced by Dave Eringa
Albums produced by Greg Haver
Albums recorded at Rockfield Studios